Jylland is one of the world's largest wooden warships, and is both a screw-propelled steam frigate and a sailship. She took part in the Battle of Heligoland on 9 May 1864, and is preserved as a museum ship in Denmark.

Design 

She was built for the Royal Danish Navy in 1860 as a sailing frigate with an auxiliar screw-drive steam engine and a wooden hull. The figurehead was carved by the sculptor Julius Magnus Petersen and represents the region of Jutland in the form of the shepherd's rod and the fishing net.

History 

During the Second War of Schleswig in 1864, she participated in the naval action against the Austrian-Prussian fleet in the Battle of Heligoland on 9 May 1864. Jylland along with Niels Juel and Heimdall bested two Austrian frigates and three small Prussian gunboats, but was unable to maintain the blockade of the Prussian North Sea ports. Jylland sustained considerable damage during the battle.

By 1874, she was in use as a training ship for naval cadets. In the 1890s she was reduced to stationary use and barely escaped scrapping in 1908. She served as a barracks and training ship between 1892 and 1908. It was, however, decided to preserve her and she was towed to Ebeltoft in 1960. The hulked frigate further deteriorated until she was placed in dry dock in 1984. Restoration proved to be a major task; over 60% of the timber had to be replaced in addition to the rigging, armament, engines and loose gear.

In Danish, she is known as simply Fregatten Jylland, although several ships have used this name. The restoration efforts were completed in 1994 and she is on permanent display in dry dock at the town of Ebeltoft, Denmark. A commemorative coin was issued by the National Bank of Denmark.

Jylland is the last surviving screw frigate.

Gallery

References 
Notes

Citations

Bibliography 

 Brouwer, Norman J. The International Register of Historic Ships. 3rd ed. London: Chatham Publishing, 1999. 
 Robert J Gardiner (ed.). Conway's All the World's Fighting Ships 1860–1905. London: Conway Maritime Press, 1979.

External links
Many photos and a brief story of the ship
Danish Naval History: Jylland  (1862–1908)
Visit to Jylland in August 2011 Many high resolution photos

Frigates of the Royal Danish Navy
Museum ships in Denmark
Steam frigates
1860 ships
Ships built in Copenhagen
Museums in the Central Denmark Region
Syddjurs Municipality
Tourist attractions in Denmark
Tourist attractions in the Central Denmark Region
Buildings and structures in Syddjurs Municipality